He Is Psychometric is a 2019 South Korean television series starring Park Jin-young, Shin Ye-eun, Kim Kwon, and Kim Da-som. It aired on tvN's Mondays and Tuesdays at 21:30 KST time slot from March 11 to April 30, 2019.

Synopsis
After losing his parents in a fire, Lee Ahn (Park Jin-young) acquires the power of psychometry, the ability to read a person or an object's past through physical contact, and he decides to use it to combat criminals. While he does not know how to control his power yet, he meets Yoon Jae-in (Shin Ye-eun) who tries her best to hide her painful secrets. Together with his foster guardian, prosecutor Kang Sung-mo (Kim Kwon), and the latter's colleague, investigator Eun Ji-soo (Kim Da-som), they team up to solve an elusive case that has been haunting the lives of Ahn, Sung-mo, and Jae-in. The case revolves around the life of prosecutor Kang, and his parents who were the main cause of fire. Jae-in and Lee Ahn heal each other through their past, present, and future to find the culprit.

Cast

Main
 Park Jin-young as Lee Ahn 
 Kim Tae-yool as young Lee Ahn
A young man who acquires the power of psychometry, the paranormal ability to read a person or object's past or secrets by touching it or if these come into contact with his skin. He lost his parents in a fire when he was young.
 Shin Ye-eun as Yoon Jae-in
 Kim Soo-in as young Jae-in
A smart young woman whose father was framed for arson. She meets Lee Ahn at the age of 19 after transferring to his high school. Her dream is to become a prosecutor and clear her father's name, but she eventually becomes a police officer. She later develop feelings for Lee Ahn and begins dating him.
  Kim Kwon as Kang Sung-mo 
Jo Byeong-kyu as young Sung-mo

He is a special investigation unit prosecutor who saved Lee Ahn in the fire that killed his parents. Later, he became Lee Ahn's legal guardian as his adoptive brother. He has a cold exterior yet cares for Lee Ahn and others around him dearly. 
 Kim Da-som as Eun Ji-soo

She is the investigator of the police special investigation unit. She often asks Lee Ahn for help as she knows about his psychometric abilities. She is very optimistic and it is obvious she likes Sung-mo.

Supporting

People around Lee Ahn
 Lee Jong-hyuk as Lee Jeong-rok
Lee Ahn's father. He was a police officer who died when the apartment caught fire.
 Noh Jong-hyun as Lee Dae-bong (21 years old)
Lee Ahn's best friend. He has been in love with Kim So-hyun since high school.

People around Yoon Jae-in
 Jung Suk-yong as Yoon Tae-ha
Jae-in's father. He was a firefighter before he became a security guard at Yeongseong Apartment and was framed of being the arsonist.
 Kim Hyo-jin as Oh Sook-ja (43 years old)
Jae-in's maternal aunt. She is a teacher and legal guardian of Yoon Jae-in after her father was arrested.
 Go Youn-jung as Kim So-hyun (21 years old)
Jae-in's childhood friend that got pregnant in high school.

People around Kang Sung-mo
 Lee Seung-joon as Kang Geun-taek
Kang Sung-mo's father. In his youth, he developed an attraction-turned-obsession over Eun-joo that he locked her up with their son Sung-mo for a long time.
 Jeon Mi-seon as  Kang Eun-joo
Kang Sung-mo's mother and the subject of Geun-taek's obsession. She bore Geun-taek a son (Sung-mo) while being locked up. When she and Sung-mo managed to escape, she had spent her entire life on hiding from Geun-taek. She was presumed dead in the Yeongseong Apartment fire.

Others
 Sa Kang as Hong Soo-yeon
 Eun Ji Soo's close friend and an autopsy director in the forensics department.
 Kim Won-hae as math teacher 
 Kim Ji-sung as Ji-sung
 Jang Eui-soo as Lee Seung-yong (21 years old)
He is the youngest investigator of the unit.
 Park Chul-min as Nam Dae-nam (49 years old)
He is a police lieutenant.
 Um Hyo-sup as Eun Byung-ho 
Eun Ji-soo's father. He is a police superintendent.

Production 
 The first script reading took place on December 6, 2018 at Studio Dragon in Sangam-dong, Seoul, South Korea.
 The series is directed by Kim Byung-soo (The Bride of Habaek, A Korean Odyssey).
 Jeong Yoo-ahn left the drama because of a sexual harassment investigation against him. He was replaced by Jo Byung-gyu.
 A press conference was held on March 5, 2019 with the presence of Kim Byung-soo, Park Jin-young, Shin Ye-eun, Kim Da-som and Kim Kwon.

Original soundtrack

He Is Psychometric: Original Soundtrack

Part 1

Part 2

Part 3

Part 4

Part 5

Part 6

Viewership

Awards and nominations

Notes

References

External links
  
 
 

TVN (South Korean TV channel) television dramas
Korean-language television shows
2019 South Korean television series debuts
2019 South Korean television series endings
South Korean romantic comedy television series
South Korean fantasy television series
South Korean mystery television series
Television series by Studio Dragon
Television series by JS Pictures